Hang-Ups is the second studio album by American punk rock band Goldfinger released by Mojo Records on September 9, 1997.  Many of the album's tracks feature more of a ska sound than their debut.  The album's first single "This Lonely Place" was not as successful as "Here in Your Bedroom", a single off their debut album, but it did gain them numerous talk show appearances and spins of the video, which parodies the 1979 film Alien.

Like their self-titled debut, the horns on the album are provided by several members of the Orange County ska scene, most notably Dan Regan and Scott Klopfenstein of Reel Big Fish on trombone and trumpet, respectively. The song "Carlita" features Angelo Moore of Fishbone on saxophone and vocals.

"Superman" was used in films Kingpin and Meet the Deedles. Two years after its release, the song gained further recognition thanks to the Tony Hawk franchise when it first appeared series Tony Hawk's Pro Skater in addition to its 2012 and 2020 remakes. The song has become so strongly associated with Tony Hawk's Pro Skater that it forms a core part of the recognisability of the series, with the 2020 documentary about the games, Pretending I'm a Superman: The Tony Hawk Video Game Story, being named for the song.

Track listing

Personnel
Goldfinger
John Feldmann – guitar, vocals
Charlie Paulson – guitar, vocals
Darrin Pfeiffer – drums, vocals
Simon Williams – bass, vocals

Additional musicians
Keyboards – Paul Hampton, except "It Isn't Just Me" by Chris Johnson
Horns – Angelo Moore, Kip Wirtzfeld, Jonas Cabrera, Gabrial McNair, Scott Klopfenstein, Dan Regan, Garth Schultz, Mike Menchaca
Backing vocals – Angelo Moore, Chris Thompson

Production
Produced by Jay Rifkin and John Feldmann
Engineered by Chris Johnson, Kevin Globerman, and Slamm Andrews
2nd engineers – Josh Achziger and Bruno Roussel
Mixed by Dave Jerden
Assisted by Annette Cisneros, Bryan Carlstrom, Elan Trujillo, and Bryan Hall
Mastered by Eddie Schryer

References

Goldfinger (band) albums
1997 albums
Universal Records albums
Albums produced by John Feldmann